Roman Oreshnikov (born 6 February 1983 in Kerch, Ukrainian SSR) is a Russian bobsledder who has competed since 2002. He won the silver medal in the four-man event at the 2008 FIBT World Championships in Altenberg, Germany.

Oreshinikov also competed in two Winter Olympics, earning his best finish of tied for ninth in the four-man event at Vancouver in 2010.

References
Bobsleigh four-man world championship medalists since 1930

1983 births
Living people
People from Kerch
Bobsledders at the 2006 Winter Olympics
Bobsledders at the 2010 Winter Olympics
Olympic bobsledders of Russia
Russian male bobsledders